Joan of Penthièvre (French: Jeanne de Penthièvre; c. 1319 – 10 September 1384) reigned as Duchess of Brittany together with her husband, Charles of Blois, between 1341 and 1364. Her ducal claims were contested by the House of Montfort, which prevailed only after an extensive civil war, the War of the Breton Succession. After the war, Joan remained titular Duchess of Brittany to her death. She was Countess of Penthièvre in her own right throughout her life.

Early life

Joan was the only child of Guy de Penthièvre (brother of John III, Duke of Brittany) and Jeanne d'Avaugour. Through her father she became Countess of Penthièvre in her own right, and established her ducal claims.

War of the Breton Succession
Joan was one of the protagonists of the War of the Breton Succession. The issue of succession to the ducal crown would involve the issue of whether a child could, regardless of gender, claim the right of "representation" of a deceased parent — in which case Joan would inherit her father's rights as the second brother of the late duke of Brittany — or whether the next eldest male heir in a partially parallel lineage outranked all others. In the Breton succession, the collateral claimant was Joan's half-uncle John, Count of Montfort, born from the second marriage of Joan's grandfather Arthur II, Duke of Brittany to Yolande of Dreux, Queen of Scots. Joan's uncle John III had been alienated from Yolande, his stepmother, and sought to prevent his half-brother John from succeeding him, which included an abortive attempt to annul his father's second marriage and so render his half-siblings illegitimate.

In December 1335, negotiations were made for a marriage between Joan and John of Eltham, Earl of Cornwall, the brother of King Edward III of England; however, it appears these arrangements did not result in an official betrothal. In 1337, Joan was betrothed to Charles of Blois in Paris, and they were living together by 1338 or 1339. In 1341, on the death of John III, the couple assumed the rule of the Duchy of Brittany, Charles having been granted permission to perform homage by King Philip VI of France by the arrêt of Conflans on 7 September 1341. They appeared to be supported by most of the local nobility and administration. However, John of Montfort did not agree to let go of his own claim, and war ensued. Ironically, while the initial argument of the Montfortist cause actually relied very strongly on the idea that Brittany should follow French successorial practice, in subsequent generations the line would vigorously enforce the notion that the Duchy of Brittany should remain independent from its royal neighbor.

When Joan's half-uncle John died in 1345 in the midst of the succession war, his wife Joanna of Flanders took arms to protect the rights of their son John IV the Conqueror against the party led by Joan and her husband Charles. Joanna organized resistance and made use of diplomatic means to protect her family's position.

After these initial successes, Joan's husband Charles of Blois was taken prisoner by the English in 1347. Thomas Dagworth was the official captor of her husband. He was released nine years afterwards, against a ransom of about half a million écus, and resumed the war against the Montforts. Charles died in the Battle of Auray, which determined the end of the war and the victory of the Montforts, leaving Joan a widow.

Later life
The contest between the two claimants was then settled in 1365 by the First Treaty of Guérande; by its terms, Joan received a substantial pension (payments of which continued until 1372) in compensation for her claims, the right to maintain the ducal title for life, all her familial lands of Penthièvre and Avaugour, and an exemption from homage to the new duke for these territories. Most critically for future events, her male heirs would recover the duchy if John IV had no male posterity, and women were now formally prohibited from inheriting the duchy.

In 1379, when John IV had been forced into exile in England, King Charles V of France attempted to annex Brittany to the French royal domain. Joan was shocked by this violation of her rights and those of her sons, as laid out in the Treaty of Guérande. Both her supporters and those of the Montfort line united to invite John IV back from his exile in England and retake control of the duchy.

After the death of Charles V, she ratified on 2 May 1381 the Second Treaty of Guérande, which essentially re-stated the terms of the first. From the legal perspective of the Treaties of Guérande, the issue of succession to the ducal crown appeared settled, although Joan's descendants provoked various conflicts with John IV and future dukes from the House of Montfort.

Succession
Joan died on 10 September 1384 and was buried at the church of the Friars Minor of Guingamp.

Joan had lost the ducal title and powers of Brittany for her descendants, and despite attempts to reclaim the ducal crown this loss was permanent. However, her descendants were appointed from time to time to high administrative posts in Brittany under the future kings of France. Her title and rights as Countess of Penthièvre were inherited only to be lost from time to time to the Duke of Brittany as her descendants continued their conflicts with the House of Montfort.

Children
Joan and Charles had the following children:
 Marguerite, married in 1351 Charles de la Cerda (d. 1354)
 Marie (c.1340–1404), Lady of Guise, married in 1360 Louis I, Duke of Anjou
 John I, Count of Penthièvre (1345–1404) - also known as John of Blois
 Guy (d. 1385)
 Henry (d. 1400)
 Charles (d. before 1364)

Notes

References

Sources

 108

See also
Dukes of Brittany family tree

Dreux, Joanna of
Dreux, Joanna of
14th-century dukes of Brittany
14th-century peers of France
14th-century women rulers
14th-century Breton women
Counts of Penthièvre
Duchesses of Brittany
House of Dreux
Royalty and nobility with disabilities